The Argonaut class reactor is a design of small nuclear research reactor. Many have been built throughout the world, over a wide range of power levels. Its functions are to teach nuclear reactor theory, nuclear physics and for use in engineering laboratory experiments.

Description 
The original Argonaut (Argonne Nuclear Assembly for University Training) was built at Argonne National Laboratory and went critical for the first time on February 9, 1957. It was shut down in 1972. This reactor was rated for 10 kilowatts.

See also 

 UF Training Reactor
 More Hall Annex

Citations

References

Further reading 

 

 
Argonne National Laboratory